"Act of God" is a legal term for events outside of human control. 

Act of God or Acts of God may also refer to:
 Divine intervention, an event attributed to God

Books
 An Act of God, a play by David Javerbaum
 JLA: Act of God, a DC Comics series
 Acts of God, a 2001 novel by Mary Morris
 Acts of God (novel), a 2003 science fiction novel by James BeauSeigneur

Film and TV
 Act of God (film), a 2009 documentary film about getting struck by lightning
 "Act of God" (Law & Order), an episode of the TV series Law & Order

Music
 Act of God (album), the only studio album by American thrash metal band Znöwhite
 Act of God, a 1999 album by American heavy metal band Pro-Pain
 Acts of God (album), a 2007 album by At War With Self
 Acts of God, a 2022 album by Immolation
 "Act of God", a song from Fear Factory's 2004 album Archetype